Jay Rand (born March 4, 1950 in Lake Placid, New York) is an American former ski jumper who competed at the 1968 Winter Olympics.

References

1950 births
Living people
People from Lake Placid, New York
American male ski jumpers
Olympic ski jumpers of the United States
Ski jumpers at the 1968 Winter Olympics